Krkavče (or Carcase) is a village in the City Municipality of Koper in the Littoral region of Slovenia close to the border with Croatia. It includes the hamlets of Abrabi, Draga, Girič, Glavini, Hrib, Mačkujek, Pršuti, Rov, Škrljevec, Solni, Sveti Maver, and Žvabi.

Church

The parish church in the settlement is dedicated to Saint Michael. It was built on the bare stone village square in 1749.

See also
Slovenian Istria

References

External links

Krkavče on Geopedia

Populated places in the City Municipality of Koper